The Imperial Japanese Army's  was formed from the Guards Mixed Brigade in June 1943 and a new Guards Regiment, the 6th, was added, with the 1st Guards Cavalry Regiment, 1st Guards Field Artillery Regiment, 1st Guards Engineer Regiment and 1st Guards Transport Regiment, and other support units.

Based in Tokyo, Japan until the end of World War II.

See also
Imperial Guard (Japan)

References 
 Madej, W. Victor, Japanese Armed Forces Order of Battle, 1937-1945 [2 vols] Allentown, PA: 1981

Guards Divisions of Japan
Military units and formations established in 1944
Military units and formations disestablished in 1945
1944 establishments in Japan
1945 disestablishments in Japan